The 1971 SCCA Formula Super Vee season was the first season of the Sports Car Club of America sanctioned Formula Super Vee championship.

Race calendar and results

Final standings

References

SCCA Formula Super Vee